"Start of a Romance" is a 1989 single by Skyy and the title track of their 1989 album.  The single was their first to place on the Hot Black Singles chart in almost two years.  "Start of a Romance" peaked at number one on the Black Singles for two weeks, their first number one since 1982.  Although the single did not chart on the Hot 100, it peaked at number forty-one on the dance charts.  It was the first of two number one hits from the Start of a Romance album.

References
 

1989 singles
Skyy (band) songs
1989 songs